Rob Delahaye (born 24 June 1959) is a Dutch former professional footballer who played for MVV between 1980 and 1994, making over 300 appearances.

Club career
Delahaye played his entire Dutch professional career for MVV which earned him the nickname Mr MVV. He finished his career abroad at FC Wiltz in Luxembourg.

Managerial career
After retiring, Delahaye became an assistant coach at MVV, temporarily taking over as head coach after the dismissal of Jan van Deinsen in February 2004 and from Ron Elsen in April 2007. He also worked as a scout for the club. He was named manager of Polish second division side Odra Opole in January 2008, joining compatriot and club chairman Guido Vreuls. After a disappointing period in charge of German side Siegen, Delahaye expected to be welcomed back by MVV but they ended his lifelong contract with the club. He joined amateur side EHC as an assistant to coach Ole Tobiasen in 2013, only to take charge himself in January 2014 when Tobiasen was dismissed.

He was named coach of amateur team Geusselt Sport for the 2017–18 season.

References

External links
 Voetbal International

1959 births
Living people
Sportspeople from Valkenburg aan de Geul
Footballers from Limburg (Netherlands)
Association football defenders
Dutch footballers
MVV Maastricht players
FC Wiltz 71 players
Dutch expatriate footballers
Expatriate footballers in Luxembourg
Dutch expatriate sportspeople in Luxembourg
Dutch football managers
MVV Maastricht managers
Odra Opole managers
Sportfreunde Siegen managers
Dutch expatriate football managers
Expatriate football managers in Poland
Expatriate football managers in Germany
Dutch expatriate sportspeople in Poland
Dutch expatriate sportspeople in Germany